Colquhoun Grant may be:
Colquhoun Grant (British intelligence officer) (1780–1829), British Army intelligence officer
Sir Colquhoun Grant (British cavalry general) (1772–1835), British Army cavalry general and MP
Walter Colquhoun Grant (1822–1861), British Army officer and a pioneer settler in British Columbia.